The Charleroi School District is a public school district covering the Boroughs of Charleroi, Dunlevy, North Charleroi, Speers, Stockdale, Twilight, and Fallowfield Township in Washington County, Pennsylvania.

Schools

Charleroi High School (9th-12th)
Charleroi Area Middle School (6th-8th)
Charleroi Area Elementary Center (K-5th)

References

External links
 

School districts in Washington County, Pennsylvania